Ozanne may refer to:

 Alfred Ozanne (1877–1961), Australian politician
 Jayne Ozanne, Anglican English evangelist
 Marie Ozanne (1906-1943), protester against the German treatment of slave labourers in the Channel Islands during World War II 
 Marie-Élisabeth Ozanne (1739–1797), French painter
 Marjorie Ozanne (1897–1973),  Guernsey author in Guernésiais and bird hospital founder
 Michael Ozanne, wheelchair rugby player
 Nicolas Ozanne (1728–1811), French artist
 Patricia Ozanne (1923–2009), rally driver 
 Pierre Ozanne (1737–1813), French artist 
 Robert Ozanne (1898–1941), French film actor
Urbain Ozanne (1835–1903), French-born American political organizer, sheriff, and businessman

See also
 Ozanne, river in France
 Mourant Ozannes, law firm 
 Françoise Ozanne-Rivierre (1941–2007), linguist

French-language surnames